Saint Germain-en-laye Hockey Club, also known as Saint Germain HC, is a field hockey club based in Saint-Germain-en-Laye, Paris, France. 

The men's 1st XI have competed in the Euro Hockey League. Where their best results were reaching the quarterfinals in the 2007–08 season and in the 2017–18 season.

Honours

Men
Champion de France masculin : 2005–06, 2006–07, 2007–08, 2008–09, 2012–13, 2013–14, 2017–18, 2018–19
Coupe de France : 2006, 2007
Vice-champion de France : 1977 (à 1 pt de Lyon)

Women
EuroHockey Clubs Champions Challenge I : vainqueur en 2009 à Vienne (équipe première féminine)
Champion de France féminin : 2006, 2008

Internationals past and present

References

French field hockey clubs
Sports clubs in Paris
Field hockey clubs established in 1927
1927 establishments in France